Punugumarana Halli is a village in Bangalore Urban district, India.

Villages in Bangalore Urban district